VM may stand for:

Businesses and organizations
VM Motori, a diesel engine manufacturer
VMware, Inc., an American technology company
Vauxhall Motors, a British car maker
Virgin Media, a cable provider in the United Kingdom
Virgin Mobile, a mobile phone service
Virgin Money (London Stock Exchange symbol VM), a bank
Voice of Music (V-M), an audio equipment manufacturer

Science and technology
 VM reactor, various series of nuclear pressurized water reactors
 VM (nerve agent), a chemical weapon agent a.k.a. edemo
 VM (operating system), IBM's virtual machine operating system
 Membrane potential, in a cell
 Molar volume, symbol Vm
 Variola major, smallpox
 Vascular malformation, in medicine
 Vasculogenic mimicry, in medicine
 Ventromedial prefrontal cortex
 Virtual machine, an emulation of a computer system
 Virtual memory, a memory management technique
 Voicemail
 Vm, from virginium, a rejected name and abbreviation for the element francium
 An email reader for Emacs
 An extension for Apache Velocity files

Transport
 Fixed-wing, aircraft in U.S. Marine Corps
 Viaggio Air (IATA airline designator VM), a private airline in Sofia, Bulgaria
 Viluppuram Junction railway station (station code VM), a railway station in Tamil Nadu, India

Other uses
 Väike-Maarja, Estonia
 Vasthy Mompoint (born 1980), Broadway actress
 Vayu Sena Medal, an Indian military award
 Verba Maximus, literary festival of BITS Pilani, Hyderabad Campus
 Vietnam (FIPS 10-4 and NATO obsolete country code VM)
 Virgin Mary, mother of Jesus
 Virtuti Militari, a Polish military award
 Visual merchandising, developing floor plans and displays to maximize sales
 Voynich manuscript, an illustrated codex hand-written in an unknown writing system